Telehdan-e Gamdad Bazar (also Romanized as Telehdān-e Gamdād Bāzār; also known as Nūkābād, Qamdād-e Bāzār, Taldān Nūkābād, and Telehdān) is a village in Pir Sohrab Rural District, in the Central District of Chabahar County, Sistan and Baluchestan Province, Iran. At the 2006 census, its population was 151, in 26 families.

References 

Populated places in Chabahar County